Sogdiana , also known as Sogdiana Fedorinskaya, born as  Oksana Vladimirovna Nechitaylo is an Uzbekistani singer and actress, born February 17, 1984, in Tashkent. She is of Ukrainian descent.

She sings in Russian, Ukrainian, Uzbek, Tajik, French, Chechen and English.

Some of the songs she wrote herself. Her name alludes to the old kingdom Sogdiana partly consistent with today’s Uzbekistan. She has described herself as shy, taciturn and introvert, but her trained voice is strong, safe and soulful and refers to Whitney Houston. As their role models, she said Sofia Rotaru, Queen, Lara Fabian, Mariah Carey, Ofra Haza, and Whitney Houston.

Career

2005 - the International musical festival of pop DISCOVERY, held in Varna, Bulgaria. On results of competition Sogdiana receives the invitation to the International competition of executors of a variety song Canzoni dal Mondo. In the first hit song "Yurak Mahzun" under the music arrangement of Rabilya Gimazutdimova "The Best Arrangement" has been awarded for nominations. On the second – Sogdiana has been awarded nominations as "the Best Singer".

2005 - Is publishing her second solo album "Mening Shahzodam" (« My prince ») in Tashkent, Uzbekistan.

2006 is acted in film "Hodzha Nasreddin – game begins" in a role of Jasmin.

2006 – Soon the song "Heart-magnet" which within 5 months any of "Advance orders section" does not manage practically, is given to rotation on radio. A song "Rotiruetsya" was played on 129 radio stations has 482 cities of translation.

At the end of June, the tours of "Factory of stars-6" on cities of Russia and the CIS countries begin.

In August, Sogdiana arrives to Tashkent to start to have an acting career in a leading role in the Biography film of "Sogdiana", directed by Fringes Yakubov.

Soundtracks of the film are "Orzularim" and "Meni Esla", written by the singer together with Ravil Gimazutdinov. These two compositions exist also in Russian and refer to «Catch up with the wind» and «It's not a dream».

On August, 30th Phillip Kirkorov stays and after a song "Heart-magnet" says such words: « What a voice and what a good song, it hypnotizes, it's magic a song. She is generally talented, very talented actress! »

On November, 15th in Tashkent releasing the film "Sogdiana" has languages of Russian and Uzbek.

On November, 25th XI ceremony takes place in the Kremlin the Gold Record player. Among those who became the nominee of this dramatic musical premium Sogdiana was also there. Its song "Heart-magnet" has held on in charts of " Russian radio in 20 weeks and on dignity has deserved that the performer has received the first figurine.

On December, 2nd the New Year's final concert of festival « New songs about the main thing » in which among 57 songs the song "Heart-magnet" for which Sogdiana has received the diploma has sounded takes place.

15, 16, and 17 of December in the biggest hall of Tashkent the Palace of Friendship of People pass three solo concerts to Sogdiana in which it executes 20 songs. The concert program consist songs in Russian (8), Uzbek (12), and French (1) languages.

On December, 19th in Uzbekistan ceremony of delivery of the premium « MTVA awards » for achievements in the field of music, TV and arts of entertainments is spent. Sogdiana is nominated in a category « The Best singer of year », but the winner, unfortunately, does not become.

On December, 29th among nominees of the premium "Sound track" in a category Solistka, Sogdiana is nominated. Rewarding takes place on February, 10th, 2007, but Sogdiana does not receive the given prize, conceding a victory to not less talented singer Valerii.

On March, 20th 2007Sogdiana becomes the laureate of the premium Pilar. The memorable diploma and the logo of competition – a figurine Pilar has been handed over to the singer. Pilar – a unique Russian competition to which managed to unite the state, enterprise and public structures.

In the end of March Sogdiana, after annual cooperation with « National musical corporation », has terminated the contract with Victor Drobyshem. This decision was accepted in consent sides, but the initiative all belonged to the singer. Sogdiana has executed all arrangements which have been stipulated by the contract and after that has solved, that it will be engaged in the career independently.

In the end of April on air « Russian of radio » the song « Blue Sky », written Ravilem Gimazutdinovym and Inessoj Kaminskoj for the first time sounds, and in May there is a clip on this compositions. It is the first clip of Sogdiana which falls outside the limits of Uzbekistan. Also in April, 2007 Sogdiana marries an Indian businessman. Their wedding takes place in Indian temple in Malaysia.

In September and November Sogdiana acts at « Factory of stars-7 » where at first with Natalia Tumshevits executes already deserved hit "Heart-magnet", and later with Tatyana Bogachyovoj « Blue Sky ».

On October, 12th « the Dark blue sky » reaches 20 weeks in charts « the Gold Record player », and this means, that on December, 1st Sogdiana receives the second figurine.

26–27 of October 2007 at Sogdiana gave birth to her son Arjun

On December, 17th rotation on radio the song "Veter Dognat" in the accelerated version.

In December Sogdiana takes part in final festivals of 2007 « New and Old songs about the main thing » where executes the hit «Blue Sky» and a song « Love has come » which was executed earlier by the actress Rose Rymbaeva.

Sogdiana sang the same song at evening, to sacred poet Robert Rozhdestvenskomu « I Wish you ». In the end of December the adjacent rights to soundtracks from a debut album of Sogdiana are passed to the First Musical Publishing house.

On February, 11th, 2008 Sogdiana becomes the DJ as it – the guest of the program "Sunflower-show" and together with Alla Dovlatovoj during two hours pleases admirers and listeners with the plans and news. The main news – an output of the third album, but the first outside Uzbekistan.

On February, 14th - an output of an album "Heart-magnet" into which 11 songs and 3 remixes have entered. « The dark blue sky », "Heart-magnet" have entered into an album as well as the songs known and grown fond by people, "Wait", « Catch up with the wind », « It's not a dream », and absolutely new compositions «Аladdin», « Two fires », "Run", « Only two hearts », "do not leave".

On March, 2nd During the  Russian Presidential Elections having their concert at Red Square concert entitled « Russia, forward » where Sogdiana takes part. On a stage the singer appears two times: at first, together with the Russian Singers to perform the song, Russia, forward and after – the song entitled "Serdce-Magnit" ("Magnetic Heart", Russian: "Сердце-Магнит") at the end of her solo song saying "Thank You" to her fans

In the meantime the composition «Catch up with the wind» 14 weeks there is in charts « a Gold record player », as well as with confidence keeps at tops other known charts of the different countries.

In March pass shootings a concert « Songs for favourite » where Sogdiana acts with a song "Veter Dognat", as well as on the Channel one the whole hour is broadcast charts entitled « 25 beauties of show business » where Sogdiana borrows honourable 10 seat.

In 2009 Sogdiana records new songs: " Sinee Nebo", "Vspominaj Menja?"  and "Na Vostok Ot Jedema", (Words of last two songs has written itself) on which subsequently has removed clips. The song "S Toboi Ili Bez Tebja" on which subsequently the clip too is removed is written. The New album of Sogdiana also prepares for an output, the working name became the same song " Love Story " In the end of the summer 2009 she married the hockey coach Bashir Kushtov.

During the creative way the young singer performs songs in different languages by different singers. It is possible to tell, that Sogdiana has grown on songs of these great people and even surpassed some of them.

Russian version of a song of Lara Fabian "To Love Again". The text to Russian version was written by Sogdiana. A song "Ishongin" — the Uzbek version of a song "Show Me" by Ofra Haza and the famous composition "De L'abime Au Rivage" Emma Shapplin.

Personal life
She was twice married and has two sons.

Filmography

Actress

Discography 
 Mening ko'ngilim (2001)
 Mening Shahzodam (2005)
 Sen kelma (2006)
 Serdce-Magnit ("Magnetic Heart", Russian: "Сердце-Магнит")  (2008)
 Edema ("Eden", Russian: Эдем)(2011)

Music Videos and PV

2004 — Ovora Bo'lma 
2004 — Netay
2004 — Mening Shahzodam
2005 — Sen Kelma
2005 — Yurak Mahzun
2005 — Serdce-Magnit ("Magnetic Heart", Russian: "Сердце-Магнит") 
2006 — Orzularim
2006 — Meni Esla
2007 — Sinee Nebo ("Blue Sky", Russian: "Синее Небо")
2008 — Razletelis' Oblaka ("Scattered Clouds", Russian: "Разлетелись Облака")
2009 — Vspominay Menya ("Remember Me", Russian: "Вспоминай меня")
2009 — Na Vostok Ot Edema("East of Eden", Russian: "На Восток от Эдема")
2010 — S Toboy Ili Bez Tebya ("With Or Without You", Russian: "С тобой или без тебя")
2014 — Molniya ("Lightning", Russian: "Молния")

References

External links 

 Official site (Russian): Согдиана. Официальный сайт.
 
 Official forum (Russian) :sogdianamusic.ru • Главная страница

1984 births
Living people
Musicians from Tashkent
21st-century Uzbekistani women singers
Uzbekistani people of Ukrainian descent
Fabrika Zvyozd
Russian-language singers
Chechen-language singers
English-language singers from Uzbekistan
French-language singers
Actors from Tashkent